Lisa Marie White (born 24 May 1993) is a Singaporean model and beauty pageant titleholder who won the title of Miss Singapore Universe 2015 and represented Singapore at the Miss Universe 2015 pageant.

Early life and education
White is born to a New Zealander father and a Singaporean mother, a speech and drama teacher. She was a student in Holy Innocents' High School from 2006 to 2009. She studied visual merchandising at Institute of Technical Education (ITE) College Central.

Pageant career 
On 19 September 2015 Lisa was crowned Miss Singapore Universe 2015 in Amber Lounge, Singapore. She was chosen in a closed-door recruitment and selection process. 

As Miss Universe Singapore, Lisa represented Singapore at Miss Universe 2015 in Las Vegas, United States on 20 December 2015 but did not place.

Acting career 
After winning the pageant, Lisa went on to act in the Mediacorp television series Tanglin where she played a nurse called Elaine.

References

1993 births
Living people
Singaporean beauty pageant winners
Miss Universe 2015 contestants
Singaporean people of Malay descent